Arkangel was a British-based bi-annual animal liberation magazine, first published in the winter of 1989. The magazine, which was sold internationally, covered global aspects of underground and overground animal rights campaigning, and promoted a vegan lifestyle. The magazine is no longer active.

The magazine was the idea of Ronnie Lee, the founder of the Animal Liberation Front (ALF). While in prison, he regularly received letters of support and details of unreported actions by ALF activists. Lee decided to publish these in the form of a magazine, with the first edition put together by Vivian Smith. The magazine continued to be written largely by activists associated with the British ALF.

See also
Bite Back
No Compromise

Notes

Further reading
Arkangel magazine on Talon Conspiracy website
Website of Arkangel.
Animal Liberation Front website

Animal Liberation Front
Defunct political magazines published in the United Kingdom
Independent magazines
Magazines about animal rights
Magazines established in 1989
Magazines with year of disestablishment missing
Online magazines published in the United Kingdom
Vegetarian publications and websites